Forest City is an integrated residential development and private town located in Iskandar Puteri, Johor, Malaysia on a land 1,370 hectares wide. First announced in 2006 as a twenty-year project, the project was pitched under China's Belt and Road Initiative.

It was officiated by then-Prime Minister of Malaysia Najib Razak in 2016, with the approval of the Sultan of Johor, Sultan Ibrahim Ismail. Forest City is a joint venture between Esplanade Danga 88, an affiliate of state government subsidiary Kumpulan Prasarana Rakyat Johor (KPRJ), through a joint venture, Country Garden Holding Ltd (CGPV), with CGPV holding 60 percent of shares, while KPRJ holds the other 40 percent. Forest City is under the management of the Iskandar Puteri City Council and the Iskandar Regional Development Authority.

The development of Forest City is contentious. The project was largely not targeted at local Malaysians but rather at upper-middle-class citizens from China who were looking to park their wealth abroad, by offering relatively affordable seafront properties compared to expensive coastal cities within their country such as Shanghai. However, initial strong sales from China collapsed after its leader Xi Jinping implemented currency controls, including a $50,000 annual cap on how much buyers could spend outside the country. Such lackluster sales were exacerbated by the 2020–2022 Malaysian political crisis and the COVID-19 pandemic. Despite 2021 controversies due to negative allegations and effects of the COVID-19 pandemic, the project has kept developing according to the original plan. The negative press was associated mainly with a Youtube video claiming the project was "useless." In response, Country Garden reiterated that such claims were not made by an authoritative international organization but rather expressed the content creator's personal opinion.

Controversy

Environmental impact 
Despite being marketed as "an energy-efficient, ecologically sensitive, land-conserving, low-polluting offshore city", the development has had significant negative environmental impact, with irreversible damage due to reclamation of ecologically sensitive coastal wetlands.

The area within which Forest City lies is protected as an Environmentally Sensitive Area (ESA) Rank 1 area, where no development is allowed except for low-impact nature tourism, research and education. Chief to this designation are two areas of international ecological significance, the Tanjung Kupang intertidal seagrass meadow, the largest of its kind in Malaysia, and the Pulai River Mangrove Forest Reserve, designated as a wetland of international importance under the Ramsar Convention.

Reclamation began in January 2014 without the legally required Detailed Environmental Impact Assessment (DEIA). Residents from Kampung Tanjung Kupang, a traditional fishing village, complained of reduced catches and other issues to the local and Johor State authorities to no avail.

Malaysia had also not informed Singapore as required under their 2005 International Tribunal for the Law of the Sea-mediated agreement on reclamation works and other treaties. Singapore subsequently sent a diplomatic note in May 2014 to the Malaysian Federal government requesting clarification on issues including: potential changes in water current speeds and the subsequent impact on navigational safety; possible erosion that might affect shoreline and Second Link infrastructure; and changes in water quality and  morphology that might affect the coastal and marine environment and local fish farms. Following this and an accompanying outcry by international environmental watchdogs, the Environment Ministry sent a request for the DEIA to Country Garden on 6 June 2014, and issued a stop-work order on 17 June 2014, although it was reported that work continued despite the stop-work order.

The DEIA was issued in January 2015, confirming that the regulations had been side-stepped and contained 81 directives, including a reduction in size from 1,600 hectares to less than 405 hectares. It acknowledged that the seagrass ecosystem had been split into two and "will be heavily impacted by the proposed development" despite these measures. Country Garden subsequently announced that it was downsizing the project by a third and dividing it into four islands, although there was subsequent evidence that some of these measures were not implemented, including photographs where silt curtains were absent and of buffer zones that were less than 100m (as opposed to the agreed 300m). Concerns also remained about the permanent impact on the seagrass, water hydrology, and loss of traditional fishing grounds, which these measures will not fully alleviate.

Other environmental concerns include claims that sand from local hills was being used at the project site and fears of stress on local water sources and sewage discharge.

Safety considerations 
Cracks began to appear in the Show Gallery, hotel buildings and roads soon after construction. There were claims that the speed of the land reclamation did not allow time for the soil to settle and stabilize, with a building consultant opining that the land was sinking, and would likely continue to do so.

Reception 
The project was described by Foreign Policy as a "massive boondoggle".  By the end of 2019, only 15,000 units had been sold, compared to a target of 700,000, and as few as 500 people actually lived in the development. There were multiple allegations of corruption at various levels and multiple stages of the project. In addition the residential units were priced according to the then-booming housing market in China, so local Malaysians were unable to afford them. Indicative of its clientele, the road signage was often exclusively written in Chinese while the few schools that opened only taught Mandarin.

Following the 2018 change in Malaysian government and subsequent political uncertainty, the worsening geopolitical environment between Malaysia and China, and suspension of the Malaysia My Second Home long term visa scheme, some Chinese nationals (who formed the majority of buyers) decided to leave the development and sold their units at steep losses, further adding to the supply overhang.

While Country Garden employed some locals, most of Forest City's workforce comprised low-wage labourers from South Asia or white-collar workers from China.

In 2018, Mahathir Mohamed, campaigning on a platform which included criticism of Chinese investment and corruption, defeated the incumbent Malaysian Prime Minister Najib Razak who had originally approved the project, and issued a "ban" on foreigners buying property. This was subsequently re-structured as changes to the long term visa program in order to mitigate objections and potential legal challenges raised by the developer.

In 2020, the COVID-19 pandemic led to increasing economic uncertainty and travel restrictions, severely affecting sales which dropped by more than 90% after March 2020. Following implementation of Malaysia's Movement Control Order, some residents returned to their home countries. COVID-19 restrictions on travel between Malaysia and Singapore presented difficulties for the remaining residents, especially those working in or with children schooling in Singapore. Some tenants also suspended operations or pulled out, citing restrictions due to the Movement Control Order or commercial non-viability.

Forest City has been described as one of the world's "most useless" megaprojects.

Location
Forest City is located in Tanjung Kupang ward in the planned city of Iskandar Puteri in southwestern Johor, about 40 km by road from Johor Bahru's central business district. The City comprises four human-made islands.

Forest City was originally a mangrove swamp populated by locals who worked as farmers and fishers in Kampung Tanjung Kupang.

Access

Public transportation
Johor Bahru Sentral railway station is the nearest railway station. It is the second-to-last on the KTM Intercity network.

Federal routes
Iskandar Coastal Highway/Persiaran Sultan Ismail (Federal Route 52) is the main route from Forest City and Iskandar Puteri to downtown Johor Bahru.

Tolled roads
Malaysia-Singapore Second Link to Kulai and Tuas and Boon Lay (Singapore).

See also
 Land reclamation
 Habitat destruction
 Iskandar Malaysia
 Johor Bahru
 Belt and Road Initiative

References

External links

 Forest City (Johor) - Official Site
 Forest City Malaysia - Resource page with project information and archive of news updates.

Iskandar Puteri
Populated coastal places in Malaysia
2016 establishments in Malaysia
Populated places in Johor
Belt and Road Initiative